Lake City is a 2008 American drama film directed by Perry Moore and Hunter Hill and starring Sissy Spacek, Troy Garity and Dave Matthews.

Plot
A mother reunites with her son after many years, who had left home as a result of a searing family tragedy.

Cast
Sissy Spacek as Maggie
Jason Davis as Shawn
Troy Garity as Billy
Dave Matthews as Red (as David Matthews)
Rebecca Romijn as Jenny
Keith Carradine as Royce
Drea de Matteo as Hope
Jeff Wincott as Leo
Colin Ford as Clayton

Production

Lake City was shot in Virginia on a $4 million budget.

Release
Lake City had its world premiere at the 2008 Tribeca Film Festival on April 25, 2008, and was released in a single theater on November 21, 2008.

Following the release, Screen Media Films acquired the rights to release the film on DVD.

Reception
On review aggregator website Rotten Tomatoes, the film has an approval rating of 12% based on reviews from 26 critics, with an average rating of 3.6/10. The site's critics consensus states: "Lake City fails to make use of its accomplished cast, with the story unraveling amid the competing visions of its dual directors". On Metacritic, the film has a score of 29 out of a 100 based on 12 critics, indicating "generally unfavorable reviews".

Bill White of the Seattle Post-Intelligencer wrote: "When Hill and Moore leave story and characters behind to veer off into suspenseless chases through cornfields, one wonders if the era of earnest American drama may be coming to a close".

Josh Rosenblatt of The Austin Chronicle said "The only thing saving Lake City from total ridiculousness is [Sissy] Spacek".

Stephen Holden reviewing for The New York Times had criticized the lead actress, writing "When Sissy Spacek speaks her cliched lines in the mediocre screenplay of [the film], her delivery lends them a resonance that is not in the written words".

According to Mick LaSalle of the San Francisco Chronicle "With all the high-profile movies blasting into theaters at this time of year, Lake City will probably get lost in the shuffle. That won't be a tragedy".

Robert Koehler of The Christian Science Monitor wrote "The astonishingly inept finish could serve as a primer in screenwriting classes on how not to wind up a family drama".

Lisa Schwarzbaum of Entertainment Weekly said that "The story is as impersonal as it is labored", while Michelle Orange of The Village Voice wrote "Add[ing] to the general torpidity and twangy tropes of this Southern family drama is the discomfort of watching a natural actor force it".

References

External links

2008 drama films
American drama films
Films scored by Aaron Zigman
Films shot in Virginia
2000s English-language films
2000s American films